Mário Maurity (31 July 1883 – 11 October 1922) was a Brazilian sports shooter. He competed in two events at the 1920 Summer Olympics.

References

External links
 

1883 births
1922 deaths
Brazilian male sport shooters
Olympic shooters of Brazil
Shooters at the 1920 Summer Olympics
Sportspeople from Rio de Janeiro (city)